The 1973 Singapore Open, also known as the 1973 Singapore Open Badminton Championships, took place from 13 to 17 December 1973 at the Singapore Badminton Hall in Singapore.

Venue
Singapore Badminton Hall

Final results

References 

Singapore Open (badminton)
1973 in badminton
1973 in Singaporean sport